Leandro Teixeira Dantas, or Leandro (born August 17, 1987) is a Brazilian football player who currently plays for Oeste. Leandro was born in Itaguaí, Rio de Janeiro.

References 

1987 births
Living people
Brazilian footballers
Brazilian expatriate footballers
Vegalta Sendai players
Fukushima United FC players
Duque de Caxias Futebol Clube players
Fluminense FC players
Oeste Futebol Clube players
Expatriate footballers in Japan
J2 League players
Association football midfielders
Sportspeople from Rio de Janeiro (state)
People from Itaguaí